Aristophon was a Greek painter, mentioned by Pliny the Elder.

Life
Aristophon was the son and pupil of the elder Aglaophon, and brother of Polygnotus. He was a native of Thasos. Pliny, who places him among the painters of the second rank, mentions two works by him: one showing Ancaeus wounded by the boar and mourned over by his mother Astypalaea, and another containing figures of Priam, Helen, Ulysses, Deiphobus, Dolon, and Credulitas.

Plutarch names  Aristophon as the painter  of a picture of Alcibiades in the arms of Nemea; Athenaeus however says it was by Aglaophon.

References

Sources

 

Year of birth unknown
Year of death unknown
Ancient Greek painters
Artists of ancient Thasos
5th-century BC painters